Lintmill Halt was a railway station about  from Campbeltown, Argyll and Bute, serving the rural locale and the nearby lint mill. The Campbeltown and Machrihanish Light Railway was a 2 ft 3 in (686 mm) narrow gauge railway in Kintyre, Scotland, between the towns of Campbeltown and Machrihanish.

History
The station had no platforms, but a passing loop was present with signals and a small signal box structure.

Upgraded from a coal carrying mineral lined and opened for passenger traffic in 1906, the railway did not have stations as such, just places where the train halted to pick up passengers. Many of the passengers were day trippers from Glasgow as a turbine steamer would bring passengers to Campbeltown early enough to catch a train to Machrihanish and allow a return journey all in one day. The next stop on the railway was Drumlemble Halt. Edmonson style tickets were issued for journeys to and from this halt.

Only three other passenger-carrying lines in the UK operated on the same gauge, all of them in Wales - the Corris Railway, the short-lived Plynlimon and Hafan Tramway and the Talyllyn Railway.

Notes

References
 
 Wham, Alasdair (2009). Trossachs and West Highlands. Exploring the Lost Railways. Wigton : G. C. Books Ltd. .

Further reading
 Farr, A. D. (1967). The Campbeltown & Machrihanish Light Railway The Oakwood Press. 
 Macmillan, Nigel S.C. (1970). The Campbeltown & Machrihanish Light Railway. Newton Abbot : David & Charles.

External links
Machrihanish History
Campbeltown and Machrihanish Railway
History of the Campbeltown and Machrihanish

Railway stations in Great Britain opened in 1906
Railway stations in Great Britain closed in 1932
Disused railway stations in Argyll and Bute